Forrester Island (Haida: Gasḵúu) is an island in the U.S. state of Alaska. It is wooded and mountainous, rising  in elevation.

Forrester Island was originally named "Santa Cristina" by Juan Pérez in 1774. In 1775, Francisco Antonio Maurelle labeled the island "San Carlos", and in 1778 William Douglas named it "Douglas Island". Royal Navy officer George Dixon named the island "Forrester Island" in 1787, which was the name adopted by George Vancouver on the Vancouver Expedition in 1793. In 1912, U.S. President William Howard Taft signed a law creating the Forrester Island Refuge, which included Forrester Island, Lowrie Island and Wolf Rock. In 1970, the area was designated the Forrester Island Wilderness.

The island hosts rookeries of Steller sea lions.

See also
Forrester Island Wilderness
List of islands of Alaska

References

Islands of Alaska
Islands of Prince of Wales–Hyder Census Area, Alaska
Islands of Unorganized Borough, Alaska